The Billboard Music Award winners for Top Gospel Song:.

Winners and nominees

References

Billboard awards